Claudia may refer to:

People

Ancient Romans
Any woman from the Roman Claudia gens
Claudia (vestal), a Vestal Virgin who protected her father Appius Claudius Pulcher in 143 BC
Claudia Augusta (63–63 AD), infant daughter of Nero by his second wife
Claudia Capitolina, princess of Commagene originally from Roman Egypt
Claudia Marcella, women of the Claudii Marcelli
Claudia Octavia (died 62 AD), first wife of Nero
Claudia Procula, a name traditionally attributed to Pontius Pilate's wife
Claudia Pulchra, a relative of the imperial family, accused of immorality and treason
Claudia Rufina, a woman of British descent who lived in Rome c. 90 AD and was known to the poet Martial
Claudia Quinta, who helped bring the statue of Cybele from Pessinus to Rome
Claudia Tisamenis, sister of Herodes Atticus
Saint Claudia, mentioned in 2 Timothy

Modern people
Claudia (given name)

Media

Television 
 Claudia (American TV series)
 Claudia (telenovela), Mexican TV series

Films 
 Claudia (1943 film)
 Claudia (1959 film), an East German film

Music 
 Claudia Quintet, an ensemble formed by drummer and composer John Hollenbeck
 Claudia Rossi, former drummer of Jack Off Jill known mononymously as Claudia

Other media 
 Claudia (play), adapted into the aforementioned 1943 film
 Claudia and David (radio program), a 1940s radio program, sometimes referred to as simply Claudia
 Claudia (magazine), a Polish magazine published by Editora Abril

Other uses
Hurricane Claudia, the name given to various storms
Ethinylestradiol/cyproterone acetate, a birth control pill sometimes sold under the brand name Claudia
Claudia (gens), one of the most prominent patrician houses at Rome

See also

Claudius (disambiguation)
Cláudya (born 1948), Brazilian singer